Cypriot cinema refers to the cinema of Cyprus, which was born much later than the cinema of most other countries.

Notable productions 

In the late 1960s and early 1970s, George Filis produced and directed Gregoris Afxentiou, Etsi Prodothike i Kypros, and The Mega Document. In 1994, Cypriot film production received a boost with the establishment of the Cinema Advisory Committee. In 2000, the annual amount set aside for filmmaking in the national budget was CYP£500,000 (about €850,000). In addition to government grants, Cypriot co-productions are eligible for funding from the Council of Europe's Eurimages Fund, which finances European film co-productions. To date, four feature films on which a Cypriot was an executive producer have received funding from Eurimages. The first was I Sphagi tou Kokora (1996), followed by Hellados (unreleased), To Tama (1999), and O Dromos gia tin Ithaki (2000).

In 2018, Marios Piperides received critical reviews at Sarajevo Film Festival and Tribeca Film Festival, with Smuggling Hendrix. Also well-received in that year was Pause, by debut director Tonia Mishiali. The most renowned Cypriot director to date is Michael Cacoyannis with the renowned Zorba the Greek.

See also
 Cinema of the world
 World cinema
 Cyprus International Film Festival
 Culture of Cyprus
 Culture of Greece
 Culture of Turkey
 List of Greek actors
 List of Turkish actors
 Film
 Cinema of Greece
 Cinema of Turkey
 List of Cypriot films
 History of Cyprus
 Peter Polycarpou
 Derviş Zaim
 Michael Cacoyannis
 Nicolas Economou

References